DIP2 disco-interacting protein 2 homolog B (Drosophila) is a protein that in humans is encoded by the DIP2B gene. A member of the disco-interacting protein homolog 2 protein family, it contains a binding site for the transcriptional regulator DNA methyltransferase 1 associated protein 1, as well as AMP-binding sites. The presence of these sites suggests that DIP2B may participate in DNA methylation. This gene is located near a folate-sensitive fragile site.

Model organisms

Model organisms have been used in the study of DIP2B function. A conditional knockout mouse line, called Dip2btm1a(EUCOMM)Wtsi was generated as part of the International Knockout Mouse Consortium program — a high-throughput mutagenesis project to generate and distribute animal models of disease to interested scientists.

Male and female animals underwent a standardized phenotypic screen to determine the effects of deletion. Twenty five tests were carried out on mutant mice and three significant abnormalities were observed. Few homozygous mutant mice survived until weaning. The remaining tests were carried out on heterozygous mutant adult mice; abnormal fertility and decreased mean corpuscular haemoglobin levels were observed in these animals.

References

Further reading 
 

Human proteins
Genes mutated in mice